The Underwater Cultural Heritage Act 2018 is an Australian Act of Parliament designed "to protect shipwrecks, sunken aircraft and their associated artefacts, that occurred 75 or more years ago, regardless of whether their location is known". Other underwater heritage items, and more recent shipwrecks or aircraft, may be protected through a declaration under the Underwater Heritage Act, and some sites also have a protected zone around them. The federal government works in collaboration with State and Territory Government agencies to protect and conserve Australia's underwater heritage.

Coverage

The Australian government collaborates with the states and Northern Territory works to protect the underwater heritage.

Vessels
The remains of vessels that have been in Australian waters for at least 75 years are automatically protected, along with certain articles associated with them. Australian waters extend from the seaward limits of a State to the outer limit of Australia's continental shelf.

Aircraft
The remains of aircraft and certain associated articles that have been in Commonwealth waters for at least 75 years are also automatically protected. Commonwealth waters extend from waters 3 nautical miles seaward of the baseline of the territorial sea that are adjacent to the States and the Northern Territory; and to the outer limit of Australia's continental shelf. (Commonwealth waters thus exclude the coastal waters of a State or the Northern Territory.)

Other
Other kinds of articles can be protected if the Minister deems them of cultural heritage significance. Such articles may be in Commonwealth waters, Australian waters, in waters beyond Australian waters, or even removed from the water.

Effect on other legislation
Related legislation, the Underwater Cultural Heritage (Consequential and Transitional Provisions) Act 2018 formally repeals the Historic Shipwrecks Act 1976, and makes minor amendments to the Australian Heritage Council Act 2003, the Navigation Act 2012, the Protection of the Sea (Powers of Intervention) Act 1981 and the Sea Installations Act 1987.

Historic shipwreck protected zones
The Act, along with its associated Underwater Cultural Heritage Act 2018 (Protected Zones) Declaration Instrument 2019, also provides for an area around protected underwater heritage to be declared a protected zone. The size of these zones may vary depending on the site.

The following historic shipwrecks lie within protected or no-entry zones declared under the Act:

 Aarhus
 SS Alert
 Bega
 Cato
 AHS Centaur
 Clonmel
 SMS Emden
 Foam
Florence D
 SS Glenelg
 SS Gothenburg
 HSK Kormoran
 Lady Darling
Llewellyn
 Submarine M24
 HMCS Mermaid

Sanyo Maru 
 Submarine I-124
 HMAS Sydney
 SS Yongala
 VOC Zuytdorp

Other archaeological sites
After the discovery and investigation of 269 highly significant Aboriginal Australian artefacts as well as an underwater spring at two underwater sites off the Burrup Peninsula (Murujuga) in Western Australia between 2016 and 2020, with the site placed on the WA Aboriginal Heritage List, the question of automatic listing of such sites (which does not occur under the current Act) was raised by lead archaeologist Jonathan Benjamin of Flinders University. A spokesman for Federal Environment Minister Sussan Ley did not say whether the Government would consider amending the Act to give automatic protection of such sites.

See also
ANCODS - old Dutch shipwrecks off Western Australia
 Australasian Underwater Cultural Heritage Database - online database of protected items

References

External links

Shipwreck law
2018 in Australian law